The law of the Slovak Republic is civil law.

Constitution
The Constitution was passed in 1992.

Legislature
The legislature is the National Council.

Legislation

Legislation includes Acts.

Acts

Act No 277/1994 Coll
Act No 136/1995 Coll
Act No 270/1995 Coll (Language law of Slovakia)

Courts and judiciary
There is a Supreme Court of Slovakia and a Constitutional Court of Slovakia.

Legal practitioners

There is a Slovak Bar Association (Slovakian: Slovenská advokátska komora).

Criminal law

The Criminal Code of 2005 replaced that of 1961.

Civil code
The Občiansky zákonník, or Slovak Civil Code, is derived from the Czechoslovak Civil Code of 1964.

References
Pries, Anne. In Winterton and Moys (eds). Information Sources in Law. Second Edition. Bowker-Saur. 1997. Chapter Twenty-Five: Slovak Republic. Pages 431 to 439.
Štefan Franko. English-Slovak Slovak-English Dictionary of Law. Slovacontact. 1995. 
Ján Svák. Judiciary and the Power of Judges in Slovakia. Eurokodex. Bratislava. 2011. 
Jan Carnogursky. "The Justice System in Slovakia". M Mark Stolarik (ed). The Slovak Republic: A Decade of Independence, 1993-2002. Bolchazy-Carducci Publishers. 2003. Pages 35 to 43.
CMS Cameron McKenna. "Legal Framework". Jonathan Reuvid (ed). Doing Business with Slovakia. GMB Publishing Ltd. 2004. Updated. 2005. Page 49. See also passim.
Milan Jančo. Introduction to Slovak Civil Law. Aleš Čeněk. Plzeň. 2010. 
Fiala, Hurdig and Kirstova. Contract Law in Slovak Republic. Kluwer Law International. 2010. Second Edition. 2014. Third Edition. 2017.
Andhov and Rampášek. Commercial and Economic Law in the Slovak Republic. Kluwer Law International. 2020. 
Andrea Oršulová and David Raus. Competition Law in the Slovak Republic. Kluwer Law International. 2011. Second Edition. 2017.
Helena Barancová and Andrea Olšovská. Labour Law in Slovak Republic. Kluwer Law International. 2011. Second Edition. 2014.
"The Legal and Regulatory Environment". Slovak Republic: A Strategy for Growth and European Integration. A World Bank Country Study. 1998. Pages 39 to 44.
Andrej Školkay. Media Law in Slovakia. Kluwer Law International. 2011. Second Edition. 2013. Third Edition. 2016.
Tomáš Gábriš. Sports Law in Slovakia. Kluwer Law International. 2012. 2019. Google Books (note: scan has the wrong title page).

External links
Guide to Law Online - Slovakia from the Library of Congress
Case law - Official
The Consolidated Laws of the Slovak republic - Official
The Consolidated Laws of the Slovak republic - Alternative private system

Law of Slovakia